The New Zealand women's cricket team played against Australia women's cricket team in December 2012 and January 2013. The tour consisted of four Women's One Day Internationals (WODIs) in which the Rose Bowl was contested for and three Women's Twenty20 Internationals (WT20Is). On 28 November 2012, Cricket Australia announced a 13-member squad for the one-day series. On the same day, New Zealand Women named their 14-member squad for the one-day series including the recall of wicket-keeper Rachel Priest. Australia's WT20I squad was announced on the eve of the series on 21 January 2013 and New Zealand naming their WT20I squad on 17 January 2013.

The WODI matches were played across Sydney with the first match being played at the Sydney Cricket Ground and the other three matches being played at North  Sydney Oval. The WT20I Series took place in Melbourne with all matches being played at Junction Oval in St. Kilda

New Zealand won the first WODI, with captain Suzie Bates scoring her 3rd century in WODIs. Australia came back to win the following three matches, winning the series 3-1, making it their 4th consecutive Rose Bowl victory. The WT20I series was won by New Zealand 2-1. After New Zealand won the first game by 6 wickets, Australia then levelled the series 1 all following a last-over victory. New Zealand went on to win the final game by 7 wickets and hence win the series.

Squads

Australia's Jess Jonassen was ruled out of the three-match T20I, due to a knee injury and hence was also ruled out of the 2013 Women's Cricket World Cup that was to be held later that year. She was replaced by Renee Chappell for the rest of the series.

WODI series

1st WODI

2nd WODI

3rd WODI

4th ODI

WT20I Series

1st WT20I

2nd WT20I

3rd WT20I

References

External links
 Series home at ESPN Cricinfo

New Zealand women Test cricketers